Acallis gripalis is a species of snout moth in the genus Acallis. It was described by George Duryea Hulst in 1886. It is found in North America, including Colorado, British Columbia, California and Arizona.

The wingspan is about 20 mm.

References

Moths described in 1886
Chrysauginae
Moths of North America